The Central Yakutian Lowland or Central Yakutian Lowlands, also known as Central Yakut Plain or Vilyuy Lowland, is a low alluvial plain in Siberia, Russia. 

Administratively the territory of the lowland is part of the Sakha Republic (Yakutia). It is an extensive plain located in the transition zone between Central and Eastern Siberia and is one of the Great Russian Regions. The main city is Yakutsk, with a number of settlements near it, but the area of the lowland is largely uninhabited elsewhere.

Geography

They drop gradually from the Central Siberian Plateau to the west and the Lena Plateau to the south and southwest. To the northwest the lowland merges with the North Siberian Lowland and to the north it is bound by the watershed fringing the Lena and Olenyok River basins, and to the northeast and east the Central Yakutian Lowland reaches the foothills of the Verkhoyansk Range, westernmost part of the East Siberian Mountains.

The Central Yakutian Lowlands are a flat plain, slightly higher in its peripheral parts. Permafrost is continuous throughout the region. Owing to poor drainage, swamps and thermokarst lakes (alases), are common, as well as low bulges or bumps known as "bulgunnyakh". In the northwest the Tukulan (Тукуланы) sand dunes are relief forms shaped by aeolian processes along the valley of the Lena River. There are also some areas of high soil salinity.

Hydrography
There are hundreds of river valleys all across the lowlands, which, besides the Lena, include the lower reaches of the Lena tributaries Vilyuy, Amga and Aldan. The entire length of the course of some of the large left tributaries of the Lena, such as the Lungkha, Tyugyuene, Sitte, Khanchaly and Kenkeme, falls wholly within the lowland area.  These rivers are subject to spring floods during the thaw period and occasional rain floods in the summer. During the winter small rivers and rivulets freeze to the bottom. The largest lakes of the lowland are Nedzheli and Ulakhan-Kyuel.

Geology
Geologically the lowland roughly corresponds to the eastern, lowest parts of the Vilyuy Syneclise. It is filled with Mesozoic deposits and Quaternary sands and loams, both of alluvial and eolian origin.

Climate and flora
The average air temperature in January is a chilly .

Most of the lowland is covered by taiga in which larch predominates. There are as well areas of birch forests, marshes and grassy meadows.

See also
Alas (geography)

References

External links

Limnological characteristics of lakes in the lowlands of Central Yakutia, Russia